William Burns Lindsay Jr. (1824–1872) was the first Clerk of the House of Commons of Canada, having served from 1867 to 1872. He served as the last Clerk of the Legislative Assembly of the Province of Canada from 1862 to 1867, after having served the assembly as Clerk Assistant from 1841.

1824 births
1872 deaths
Canadian lawyers
Clerks of the House of Commons (Canada)